Luba is the debut EP by Canadian singer Luba, released on Capitol-EMI of Canada. Included is the hit single "Everytime I See Your Picture", a popular song in Canada at that time, which eventually jumpstarted her major singing career.  The EP was available on vinyl record and cassette tape.

Track listing
"Scarlet Letter" – 4:43
"Everytime I See Your Picture" – 3:52
"Paramour" – 3:50
"Raven's Eyes" – 3:19

References

External links
 Official Luba website
 Luba at canoe.ca
 Luba on Myspace

1982 debut EPs
Luba (singer) albums